Mrs. Overtheway's Remembrances (1869) is the first children's book published by author Juliana Horatia Ewing (1841-1885). The book was published by George Bell & Sons, York Street, Covent Garden, London, and had illustrations by J.A. Pasquier and J. Wolf.

The story was originally published in serial form in Aunt Judy's Magazine, from May 1886 to October 1888.

References

 Carpenter, Humphrey and Mari Prichard. Oxford Companion to Children's Literature. Oxford University Press, 1997. 
 Zipes, Jack (ed) et al. The Norton Anthology of Children's Literature: The Traditions in English. W. W. Norton, 2005. 
 Zipes, Jack (ed.). The Oxford Encyclopedia of Children's Literature. Volumes 1-4. Oxford University Press, 2006. 
 Watson, Victor, The Cambridge Guide to Children's Books in English. Cambridge University Press, 2001.

External links
 Mrs. Overtheway's Remembrances at Project Gutenberg

1869 British novels
British children's novels
19th-century British children's literature
1860s children's books